Myton Warriors are an amateur rugby league club based in the Myton area of Kingston upon Hull, East Riding of Yorkshire. They compete in the BARLA National Conference League Premier Division, the top tier of amateur rugby league in England, and the fourth overall tier of rugby league in England. The Warriors have local rivalries with Skirlaugh, West Hull, East Hull, and Hull Dockers.

History and formation
The Myton Warriors were formed in 1997 after previously being called Bay Horse A.R.L.F.C., playing in Division 1 of the Hull & District League. They made the second round of the 1998 Challenge Cup, after defeating London Skolars 12–10.

The Myton committee were approached by the Northern Dairies youth section (a rugby union club in the Hull area) in 1999, who proposed a merger between the open-age and youth teams from both clubs. This merger happened a year later.

Both club's committees merged and formed the club's current committee, after three years of playing from a local high school. Marist Rugby Union club approached the club in 1999 and offered to share their facilities with Myton. The Warriors have played at the Marist Rugby Union club grounds from that time. The facilities have now been developed to house rugby league, rugby union and football games on Saturdays and Sundays in winter, and cricket in the summer. It is now administrated by a committee in the name of the Marist Sporting Club in all sections.

Myton competed in the Yorkshire League for seven years and gained promotion in 2005/06 after they were Senior Division One champions. The following season Myton finished second in the league and runners-up in the play-offs. They also won the Yorkshire Cup in the 2006/07 season, only the second cup of their history. In the 2017 Challenge Cup, Myton made the third round for the first time, losing to Doncaster.

Honours
Yorkshire Senior Division One champions – 2005/06
Yorkshire Senior Premier Division Runners-up – 2006/07
Yorkshire Cup Winners – 2006/07

References

External links
Official website
National Conference League profile
Rugbyleagueproject.org

BARLA teams
Rugby league teams in the East Riding of Yorkshire
Sport in Kingston upon Hull
English rugby league teams
Rugby clubs established in 1997
1997 establishments in England